Heteropsis pauper is a butterfly in the family Nymphalidae. It is found on Madagascar. The habitat consists of forests.

References

Elymniini
Butterflies described in 1916
Endemic fauna of Madagascar
Butterflies of Africa
Taxa named by Charles Oberthür